Carson-Andrews Mill and Ben F.W. Andrews House, also known as Andrews Mill, is a historic home and grist mill located near Washburn, Rutherford County, North Carolina.  The Carson-Andrews Mill was built between about 1830 and 1835, and is a two-story-with-attic heavy timber frame grist mill.  Operation of the mill ceased in the early 1930s.  The Ben F. W. Andrews House was built between about 1904 and 1908, and is a two-story, Colonial Revival style frame dwelling with a one-story rear ell.  It features a pedimented, two-tier center-bay porch with one-story wraparound sections.  Other contributing resources are the landscaped grounds, water wheel and stone mount (1897), flower house (c. 1908–1910), and privy.

It was added to the National Register of Historic Places in 2008.

References

Grinding mills in North Carolina
Houses on the National Register of Historic Places in North Carolina
Grinding mills on the National Register of Historic Places in North Carolina
Colonial Revival architecture in North Carolina
Industrial buildings completed in 1835
Houses completed in 1908
Houses in Rutherford County, North Carolina
National Register of Historic Places in Rutherford County, North Carolina
1908 establishments in North Carolina